Charles Mortimer, DD (b York 5 April 1726 – d Oxford 26 August 1784) was an Oxford college head.

Mortimer graduated BA from University College, Oxford in 1748. He became a Fellow of Lincoln College, Oxford in 1751. He was Rector of Lincoln College, Oxford, from 1781 until his death.

References

People from York
1726 births
1784 deaths
Alumni of University College, Oxford
Fellows of Lincoln College, Oxford
Rectors of Lincoln College, Oxford
18th-century English people